Richard Goodmanson is an American businessman.

Education
Goodmanson's degrees include an MBA, BEc and BCom, B Eng (Civil).

Career
Goodmanson was Director of Rio Tinto plc and Rio Tinto Limited beginning in 2004. He was elected by shareholders in 2005 and stood for re-election in 2008. Goodmanson was also the chairman of the Committee on social and environmental accountability.

Goodmanson worked at senior levels for McKinsey & Company, PepsiCo and America West Airlines, where he was president and CEO.

Goodmanson joined DuPont in early 1999 and became executive vice president and chief operating officer at that time. In that role he was responsible for global functions, and the non US operations of DuPont, with particular focus on growth in emerging markets.

Goodmanson retired from DuPont in September 2009.

Goodmanson was also chairman of the United Way of Delaware since 2006 and the Director since 2002.

References

Year of birth missing (living people)
Living people
DuPont people